Peter Wyche is the name of:

 Sir Peter Wyche (ambassador) (c.1593-1643), English merchant and ambassador to the Ottoman Empire
 Sir Peter Wyche (diplomat) (1628-c.1699), English diplomat and translator